Mourad N'Zif (born 1 January 1984) is a French former professional footballer who played as a midfielder.

Career
N'Zif started his career with Le Mans, but did not make a first-team appearance for the club. In the summer of 2004, he signed for Championnat National side Pau FC on a free transfer. He spent three seasons with Pau and scored a total of nine goals in 93 league games. N'Zif joined Stade Lavallois in 2007 and scored his first goal for the club in the 4–0 win away at FC Istres in the first round of the Coupe de la Ligue. He played for AS Beauvais Oise during the 2008–09 season, making 35 league appearances for the side. He left Beauvais in the summer of 2009, and later had a spell in the Belgian Second Division with A.F.C. Tubize. He scored one goal in 12 matches for Tubize, but was released in December 2009, and returned to Pau on 9 July 2010.

Personal life
Born in France, N'Zif is of Moroccan descent.

References

1984 births
Living people
People from Domont
French sportspeople of Moroccan descent
French footballers
Footballers from Val-d'Oise
Association football midfielders
Championnat National players
Championnat National 2 players
Championnat National 3 players
Challenger Pro League players
Pau FC players
Stade Lavallois players
AS Beauvais Oise players
A.F.C. Tubize players
US Orléans players
Red Star F.C. players
Tarbes Pyrénées Football players
Aviron Bayonnais FC players